Ebrahimabad (also Romanized as Ebrāhīmābād; also known as Mashkābād, Moshkābād, and Mushkābād) is a village in Moshkabad Rural District, in the Central District of Arak County, Markazi Province, Iran. At the 2006 census, its population was 1,738, in 542 families.

References 

Populated places in Arak County